Raffaele Baldassarre may refer to:

 Raffaele Baldassarre (politician) (1956 – 2018), Italian member of the European Parliament
 Raffaele Baldassarre (actor) (1932 - 1995), Italian actor